Pyramid Peak is a  mountain summit located in Mount Rainier National Park in Pierce County of Washington state. It is part of the Cascade Range and overlooks Indian Henry's Hunting Ground. It is situated at the base of the Success Cleaver, south of South Tahoma Glacier, and southwest of Pyramid Glacier. The summit provides views of Mount Rainier, Mount Adams, Mount St. Helens, and peaks of the Tatoosh Range. Precipitation runoff from Pyramid Peak drains into Pyramid Creek, Tahoma Creek, and Fishers Horn Pipe Creek, which are all tributaries of the Nisqually River.

History
The descriptive name Pyramid Peak came from its pyramidal shape. An early writer described the peak as follows; "We had a better chance to observe Pyramid Peak in the morning light. It is in the form of a gigantic pyramid, perfect in outline. From a distance it appears to be black basalt, and on its sides no snow clings." The name was officially adopted in 1913 by the United States Board on Geographic Names. The first ascent of this peak was made in 1915 by a Mountaineers party.

Climate

Pyramid Peak is located in the marine west coast climate zone of western North America. Most weather fronts originate in the Pacific Ocean, and travel northeast toward the Cascade Mountains. As fronts approach, they are forced upward by the peaks of the Cascade Range (Orographic lift), causing them to drop their moisture in the form of rain or snowfall onto the Cascades. As a result, the west side of the Cascades experiences high precipitation, especially during the winter months in the form of snowfall. During winter months, weather is usually cloudy, but, due to high pressure systems over the Pacific Ocean that intensify during summer months, there is often little or no cloud cover during the summer.

See also

 Geography of Washington (state)
 Geology of the Pacific Northwest

References

External links
 Pyramid Peak: weather forecast
 National Park Service web site: Mount Rainier National Park
 Climbing Pyramid Peak: YouTube

Cascade Range
Mountains of Pierce County, Washington
Mountains of Washington (state)
Mount Rainier National Park
North American 2000 m summits